Donda Academy is an unaccredited Christian private school for pre-kindergarten through twelfth grade, located in Simi Valley, California, United States. It was founded in 2022 by American rapper Kanye West. Parents had to sign a non-disclosure agreement to keep the school's location secret and to say nothing about it; it charges $15,000 per student. Students wear blackshirt Balenciaga uniforms designed by West himself.

On October 27, 2022, it was reported the school closed "abruptly" after West made antisemitic comments in interviews and on social media. It was reopened hours later.

History 
In September 2022, West revealed that he opened a Christian private school named Donda Academy after his late mother Donda West, on the site of the defunct Simi Valley Stoneridge Preparatory School. Rolling Stone was told that parents are required to sign a non-disclosure agreement to register their children. The principal and executive director for the 2022–23 school year is Brianne Campbell, a Masters student at Pepperdine University who had previously worked as an actress and choir director. The school enrolled about 100 students and employs 16 teachers, with a number of celebrities' children in attendance  West's four children with Kim Kardashian do not attend the school; instead they attend Sierra Canyon School.

In October 2022, Tamar Andrews, a Jewish educator who worked at the Academy, resigned after West's antisemitic comments.

On October 27, 2022, the school notified parents that it had canceled the remainder of the 2022–23 school year and would reopen at the beginning of the 2023-24 school year. Hours later, the school notified parents that the school would reopen on October 28, 2022. The same day as the second email singer Keyshia Cole pulled her son out of the school. When a fan asked on Twitter if she had signed an NDA, Cole responded, "And there was no NDA signed. Idk who may have but that wasn't brought up to us."

Academics 
The school curriculum includes Christianity, language arts, mathematics, and science. It also includes enrichment courses, such as world languages, the visual arts, film, choir, and parkour. The school has a 10:1 ratio of students to teachers, and no class exceeds 12 students.

The school has not sought accreditation by the private Western Association of Schools and Colleges, as private schools in California are not required to be accredited or licensed, though they do have to register with the state.

Basketball team
The school's basketball team is named the Donda Doves. The team was featured on the January 2022 cover of Slam, a basketball-focused publication. In order of appearance, the players who appeared on the cover along with West were Bryce Baker, Brandon White, Jalen Hooks, Chuch Bailey, Javonte "JJ" Taylor, Jahki Howard, Robert Dillingham, Seven Bahati, Braeden Moore, Omarion Bodrick, and Zion Cruz. 

Their inaugural game was held in February 2022 at the Credit Union 1 Arena, playing against Chicago Prep. The Doves won the game 85-62.

The team was scheduled to appear at the Hoophall Classic and Kentucky Play-By-Play Classic showcases in 2022, but the invitations were rescinded in late October. ESPN rated player Robert Dillingham number 8 on their ESPN 100 list; speculation surrounding Dillingham continuing with the team began in late October after West's antisemitic remarks, the abrupt school closure and reopening, and the showcases being rescinded resulted in a "fallout" for the school.

After the showcase invitations were canceled, players JJ Taylor (small forward) and Chuck Bailey III (reserve guard) left the school, with Taylor transferring to San Ysidro High School.

References

External links 

2022 establishments in California
Christian schools in California
Education in Simi Valley, California
Educational institutions established in 2022
Private K-12 schools in California
Kanye West
Educational institutions disestablished in 2022
2022 disestablishments in California